Leet is a surname. Notable people with the surname include:

 Isaac Leet (1801–1844), American politician
 Mildred Robbins Leet (1922–2011), American entrepreneur and philanthropist
 Norman Leet (born 1962), English footballer 
 William Leet (1833–1898), Irish Victoria Cross recipient
 William A. Leet, American farmer

See also
 Leet (disambiguation)
 Leete (disambiguation)